Japanese millet is a common name for several plants and may refer to:

Echinochloa esculenta
Echinochloa frumentacea

References

Millets